Melissa DeRosa is an American former government official.  She served as Secretary to the former Governor of New York, Andrew Cuomo, from 2017 until 2021.

Early life and education
DeRosa was raised in Albany and Saratoga Springs, New York and has two siblings. She is the daughter of Giorgio DeRosa, a lobbyist who is a senior partner at Bolton-St. Johns, an Albany-based lobbying firm.  

At 16, she was an intern for the political director of the New York State AFL–CIO. 

DeRosa attended the private school, Albany Academy for Girls, graduating in 2000. She then attended Cornell University, graduating in 2004 from the Cornell University School of Industrial and Labor Relations.  While an undergraduate student at Cornell, she worked in the Senate office of Hillary Clinton in Washington, D.C. during a summer. 

After graduation from college in 2004, DeRosa worked for a year as a publicist for Theory, a fashion house in New York. She then worked as a lobbyist for Bolton-St. Johns. In 2009, she completed an MPA from the Cornell Institute for Public Affairs.

Career
In 2009, DeRosa was the New York state director of Barack Obama's PAC, Organizing for America, and as the director of communications and legislation for the Albany-based lobbying firm Cordo and Company. In 2011, she became deputy chief of staff and acting chief of staff for New York State Attorney General Eric Schneiderman. 

In March 2013, she became director of communications for Governor Andrew Cuomo. DeRosa later became strategic adviser. In 2015 DeRosa was appointed Chief of Staff.

Secretary to Governor Cuomo
In 2017, she was promoted to Secretary to the Governor of New York, and became Cuomo's top aide and one of his closest advisers. The Secretary to the Governor was described by The New York Times as the most powerful appointed official in the state, and she was the first woman appointed to the role. 

She helped steer bills through the legislature, including the $15 minimum wage, paid family leave and expanded insurance coverage for in vitro fertilization. She was also the chair of the New York State Council on Women and Girls and head of the Covid-19 maternity task force, and in 2017, DeRosa spoke publicly about her experience with sexual harassment and encouraged women to "speak up and speak out." 

During the COVID-19 pandemic, she had a major role in the coordination and management of the New York response. 

In March 2020, in the early days of the COVID-19 pandemic in New York when testing was significantly limited, Cuomo’s administration received access to priority rapid coronavirus testing and fast results, according to The New York Times. The New York Times also reported state officials said DeRosa contacted the New York Health Commissioner to request rapid testing for her father after he was exposed to someone with COVID-19, and the decision to grant access to rapid testing was made by health officials due to DeRosa's close contact with the governor. In May 2021, federal prosecutors began to investigate the priority testing program. 

In March 2021, The Wall Street Journal and The New York Times reported on allegations that a group of Cuomo administration officials, including DeRosa, convinced public health officials to change a July 2020 report on nursing home deaths from COVID-19 in New York that would have otherwise shown more deaths than originally reported, after New York Attorney General Letitia James released a report in January 2021 that indicated the original published death toll was less than half of the 15,000 deaths attributable to COVID-19. According to the Cuomo administration, through counsel, "the out-of-facility data was omitted after D.O.H. could not confirm it had been adequately verified" and the conclusions of the report, which looked at factors contributing to the spread of COVID-19, were not altered. 

In an April 2021 report, The New York Times reported on the office's workplace environment.  It reported that several Cuomo staff members said "Cuomo and staff members, including his top aide, Melissa DeRosa, would scream and curse at subordinates over small stumbles, like misspelling names." 

DeRosa was named in an August 3, 2021, report by the New York State Attorney General as having spearheaded efforts to retaliate against and discredit a woman who has accused Cuomo of sexual harassment. An attorney for DeRosa said she acted after obtaining advice from legal counsel. 

CNBC reported on August 6, 2021, that DeRosa's father and her brother actively lobbied members of Cuomo’s staff in 2021 for clients on a range of issues.

DeRosa resigned as Secretary to the Governor on August 8, 2021. Her resignation was effective August 24.

Personal life

In 2016 she married Matthew Wing, an Uber senior communications officer, who was formerly a Cuomo press secretary in 2013 and 2014, and then communications director for the governor’s re-election campaign. They met in 2013 when both worked for Governor Cuomo, when she was the communications director and Wing was a press secretary. Her mother-in-law is Audrey Strauss, United States Attorney for the Southern District of New York. 

DeRosa's brother Joseph DeRosa and her sister Jessica Davos also work at Bolton-St. Johns.

See also
 New York COVID-19 nursing home scandal
 Andrew Cuomo sexual harassment allegations

References

Year of birth missing (living people)
Living people
People from Saratoga Springs, New York
People from Albany, New York
Cornell University School of Industrial and Labor Relations alumni
Public relations people
New York (state) Democrats
Women government officials